Barbara Harris may refer to:

Barbara Harris (bishop) (1930–2020), first woman ordained a bishop in the Anglican Communion
Barbara Harris (actress) (1935–2018), American actress
Barbara Eve Harris (born 1959), Canadian actress
Barbara Harris (singer) (born 1945), lead singer of the R&B group The Toys
Barbara Harris (voice casting director)
Barbara Harris (born 1951), fifth wife and widow of Cary Grant
Barbara Harris, former Miss California
Barbara Harris, birth control activist, founder of Project Prevention (formerly known as C.R.A.C.K.)